Geodermatophilus nigrescens is a bacterium from the genus Geodermatophilus which has been isolated from a dry river valley from Dongchuan in China.

References

Bacteria described in 2012
Actinomycetia